A spider angioma or spider naevus (plural: spider naevi), also nevus araneus, is a type of telangiectasis (swollen, spider-like blood vessels on the skin) found slightly beneath the skin's surface, often containing a central red spot and deep reddish extensions (see Blood color) which radiate outwards like a spider's web or a spider's legs. They are common and often benign, presenting in around 10–15% of healthy adults and young children. However, having more than three spider angiomas is likely to be abnormal and may be a sign of liver disease and/or hepatitis C (HCV virus); it also suggests the probability of esophageal varices.

Signs and symptoms

Spider angiomas are found only in the distribution of the superior vena cava, and are thus commonly found on the face, neck, upper part of the torso, and arms.

Cause
Spider angiomas form due to failure of the sphincteric muscle surrounding a cutaneous arteriole. The central red dot is the dilated arteriole and the red "spider legs" are small capillaries carrying away the freely flowing blood. If momentary pressure is applied, it is possible to see the emptied capillaries refilling from the center. No other angiomas show this phenomenon.

The dilation, in turn, is caused by increased estrogen levels in the blood. Many pregnant women and women using hormonal contraception have spider angiomas, which is due to high estrogen levels in their blood. Individuals with significant liver disease also show many spider angiomas, as their liver cannot metabolize circulating estrogens, specifically estrone, which derives from the androgen androstenedione. About 33% of patients with cirrhosis have spider angiomas.

Hepatitis C is an infection that can lead to irreversible liver damage. The hepatitis C virus (HCV) spreads through contaminated blood, and people are often infected by sharing drug paraphernalia or unsanitized tattoo guns and needles, piercing equipment, or manicure tools. To make matters worse, symptoms of the HCV virus can take years to appear, and this is likely why most of those infected with hepatitis C do not even realize that they are infected, and can continue to spread the virus unknowingly.

Unfortunately, many symptoms do not start to appear until some damage to the liver has been done. Unlike in the past when hepatitis C was not curable and continued to worsen as years passed, today most positive hepatitis C (HCV virus) cases (95-98%) are now curable by taking a fairly newer treatment in the form of a prescribed daily oral medication for the full duration of 12 weeks. This treatment is usually well tolerated, with little to no side effects whatsoever. 

Spider angiomas (spider-like blood vessels on the skin) are one of the main symptoms caused by a hepatitis C (HCV virus) infection. Discovering an infected patient with hepatitis C early on in the infection phase increases the chances of the virus being successfully treated and cured by oral medication. Some patients can be infected with hepatitis C for decades without knowing, and without experiencing any signs or symptoms of the virus. While hepatitis A and B have a protective vaccine available, there are no vaccines available to protect against the HCV virus (hepatitis C), Once contracted, if left untreated, hepatitis C can cause the liver to swell or become inflamed, making it difficult to function adequately in order to properly filter out chemicals and toxins. When the hepatits C (HCV) infection turns chronic, it can cause full-blown cirrhosis of the liver (scarring of the liver), making it difficult for the liver to filter out waste and to store nutrients. This can also lead to liver cancer and eventually will lead to liver failure.

Diagnosis
Diagnosis is by clinical examination. Spider naevi are most commonly seen by general practitioners, or dermatologists. Whilst a lesion can be identified as a spider naevus, this is not a diagnosis in itself. The clinical picture should be indicative of whether there is underlying disease that should be investigated.

Treatment

Spider angiomas are asymptomatic and usually resolve spontaneously. This is common in the case of children, although they may take several years to disappear. If the spider angiomas are associated with pregnancy, they may resolve after childbirth. In women taking oral contraceptives, they may resolve after stopping these contraceptives.

For spider angiomas on the face, techniques such as electrodesiccation and laser treatment can be used to remove the lesion. There is a small risk of a scar, however it usually leaves nothing.

See also 
 List of cutaneous conditions

References

External links 

Dermal and subcutaneous growths
Diseases of arteries, arterioles and capillaries